Iman Basafa (born 3 January 1992), is an Iranian professional footballer who most recently played as a defensive midfielder. He represented Iran national team at various youth levels.

Club career

Iman Basafa began his youth career at Shahrdari Bandar Abbas and signed his first professional contract for Aluminium Arak FC in July 2012. He signed for Esteghlal FC in 2013 and later joined Esteghlal Khuzestan in 2014. His next destination was Fajr Sepasi Shiraz in 2015 and after two years, Basafa signed for Malavan Bandar Anzali in 2017.

In 2018, he returned to Aluminium Arak for a second spell with the club. However, he moved to Pars Jonoubi Jam after a year. In September 2020, he joined Machine Sazi Tabriz and later moved to India and signed with Bengaluru FC in the Indian Super League.

Iman Basafa has played in both the first and second tier of the Iranian league system. He is well-versed with domestic football in Iran and possesses many qualities learned from his experience there. He has made 104 appearances in the Azadegan League (the second tier), recording 17 goals and one assist in the process. The 29-year-old has also played over 64 games in the Persian Gulf Pro League (first tier), managing two goals and two assists.

Furthermore, Basafa has one AFC Champions League appearance, which was with Esteghlal FC. The midfielder has recorded over 12,116 minutes of football across his career and is no way past his best. Basafa has made the most appearances for Fajr Sepasi Shiraz (57) and also scored the most goals for them (9) among all his clubs.

Last season’s performance
The defensive midfielder turned out for Machine Sazi Tabriz in the Persian Gulf Pro League. He made 20 appearances for the outfit, clocking 1601 minutes of football. He did not score any goals and provided one assist. The outfit finished bottom, in 16th place, managing only 14 points in 30 games. Basafa also featured in the Hazfi Cup, in a 3–0 defeat to Foolad FC in the fourth round.

After his move to India, Basafa made his Indian Super League debut for Bengaluru FC on 20 November 2021 against NorthEast United FC in a 4–2 win. On 24 November, he played the whole match against Odisha FC but they lost by 3–1. He scored his first league goal for Bengaluru on 26 January 2022 against Chennaiyin in their 3–0 win.

Style of play
Iman Basafa is a defensive midfielder. He likes to sit deep and protect the backline.

Career statistics

References

External links
 Iman Basafa at metafootball.com
 
 Iman Basafa at PersianLeague.com 
 
 

1992 births
Sportspeople from Isfahan
Esteghlal F.C. players
Esteghlal Khuzestan players
Living people
Iran under-20 international footballers
Association football midfielders
Iranian footballers
Shahrdari Arak F.C. players
Fajr Sepasi players
Malavan players
Pars Jonoubi Jam players
Bengaluru FC players
Indian Super League players